Mauritiodoria is a genus of tachinid flies in the family Tachinidae.

Species
Mauritiodoria spinicosta (Thomson, 1869)

Distribution
Mauritius, Réunion.

References

Exoristinae
Insects of Mauritius
Insects of Réunion
Diptera of Africa
Tachinidae genera